KonoSuba is a Japanese light novel series written by Natsume Akatsuki. The series has received four spin-off light novels and a manga adaptation.

Light novels

KonoSuba: God's Blessing on this Wonderful World!

KonoSuba: An Explosion on this Wonderful World!

KonoSuba: An Explosion on this Wonderful World! Bonus Story

Consulting With This Masked Devil!

KonoSuba: God's Blessing on this Wonderful World! Extra Attention to that Wonderful Fool!

Manga

KonoSuba: God's Blessing on this Wonderful World!

KonoSuba: An Explosion on this Wonderful World!

KonoSuba: An Explosion on this Wonderful World! Bonus Story

References

KonoSuba
KonoSuba
KonoSuba